Li Yuanyuan, may refer to:

Li Yuanyuan (actress), winner of a 1990 Golden Eagle Award
Li Yuanyuan (engineer) (born 1958), Chinese engineer and academician of the Chinese Academy of Engineering
Li Yuanyuan (swimmer) (born 1976), Chinese synchronized swimmer

See also
 Liu Yuanyuan, (born 1982), Chinese biathlete and cross-country skier